Awuah Panin III, known in the United States as Harry Danso, is an Ashanti nana from the Asokwa area, which includes his hometown of Koforidua.  He lives in Worcester, Massachusetts, but visits his native Ghana several times a year.

Nana
He immigrated to the United States in 1985 and as of 2016 was a middle manager at an endoscopy company.  When he left Ghana there were several other men ahead of him in line for the throne, but the title eventually fell upon him.  He accepted it, but discourages his Ghanaian co-workers from using the title nana in the workplace.

Personal life
Panin is involved with the New Juaben Association of New England, which sends X-ray machines, gloves, and syringes to a cash-strapped hospital in Ghana.  He was named to Worcester’s Human Rights Commission in 2011.  He has a college degree, is married, and has children.

See also
Otumfuo Nana Osei Tutu II

References

Living people
Ashanti monarchs
Ghanaian emigrants to the United States
People from Worcester, Massachusetts
Year of birth missing (living people)